Thomas William "Charlie" Chignell (28 April 1866 – 17 November 1952) was an England-born South African international rugby union player, he played provincial rugby for Western Province. Chignell made his only appearance for South Africa during Great Britain's 1891 tour, South Africa's first as a Test nation. He played as a forward in the 3rd Test of the three match series, at the Newlands Stadium, Cape Town, Great Britain won the game 4–0. Chignell died in 1952, in Cape Town, at the age of 86.

References

1866 births
1952 deaths
Rugby union players from Exeter
South Africa international rugby union players
Rugby union forwards
Western Province (rugby union) players